The Keeper, or its plural The Keepers, may refer to:

Films
 The Keepers (1959 film), English-language release of French film  La Tête contre les murs
 The Keeper (1976 film), starring Christopher Lee
 The Keeper of Traken, a 1981 serial from the television programme Doctor Who
 The Keeper (1995 film), starring Regina Taylor
 The Keeper (2002 film), with music composed by Evan Evans
 The Keeper (2004 film), starring Dennis Hopper and Asia Argento
 The Keeper: The Legend of Omar Khayyam, a 2005 film starring Vanessa Redgrave
 The Keeper (2009 film), starring Steven Seagal
 The Keepers, a 2017 film documentary series about the murder of American nun Cathy Cesnik
 The Keeper (2018 film), a film about footballer Bert Trautmann

Other uses
 The Keeper (2014 novel), a 2014 novel by John Lescroart
 The Keeper (Dekker novel), a 2011 short story by Ted Dekker and Tosca Lee
 "The Keeper" (short story), a 1957 short story by H. Beam Piper
 The Keeper, a character in "The Cage", the pilot episode of Star Trek
 The Keeper, a character in "The Gamekeeper", an episode of Stargate SG-1
 The Keepers, a 1984 Australian television series, starring Bill Hunter
 The Keepers, a 1989 Australian play by Bob Maza
 "The Keeper", a song written by Chris Cornell for the 2011 film Machine Gun Preacher
 "The Keepers", a song by Santigold from the 2012 album Master of My Make-Believe

See also
 Keeper (disambiguation)
 Keepers (disambiguation)